East Rainton is a village found in the outskirts of Durham, in the City of Sunderland, Tyne and Wear, in the north east of England. It is situated alongside the A690 road between Sunderland and Durham, near Houghton-le-Spring.

The village is home to East Rainton cricket club, which was founded before 1851 and which has seen many successes throughout its long history. The 2nd XI are current North East Durham League champions. The village also boasts a football team: East Rainton FC, the second team from the village to bear the name.

The village once had four pubs: 'The Rose and Crown', 'The Blacksmiths Arms', 'The Village Tavern' and the last-remaining 'The Olde Ships Inn' (previously known as 'The Travellers Rest' - a name derived from it being a staging post on the Durham to Sunderland coaching road which passed through the village). In 2016, the Olde Ships Inn was bought by new owners and became part of the 'Angelo's' restaurant chain, serving Italian cuisine to its customers rather than the traditional pub meals the building once sold. The Highfield Hotel bar is open to non-residents.

Other village facilities include a small premier shop, East Rainton Primary School, the church of St Cuthbert, and the Methodist chapel. The village post office closed in 2011 and its space was used to expand the local shop.

The village is located just by the outskirts of Durham on the area of high ground to the south of Houghton-le-Spring, and the name Rainton is thought to stem from the Anglo-Saxon - Rennington or Renn's settlement.

External links

Villages in Tyne and Wear
City of Sunderland